Kawatsa is a nearly extinct Angan language of Papua New Guinea. According to one source, an estimated 12 people are believed to speak the language. It is spoken in Katsiong village, Tsewi ward, Kome Rural LLG.

References

Languages of Morobe Province
Angan languages
Critically endangered languages
Endangered Papuan languages